Eremophila behriana is a flowering plant in the figwort family, Scrophulariaceae and is endemic to South Australia. It was one of the plants collected on the 1858 - 1859 Babbage expedition to explore areas north of Adelaide and was later described by Ferdinand von Mueller. It is a small shrub, usually with egg-shaped, serrated leaves and lilac to purple flowers with hairs on the lower petal lobe.

Description
They are also hairy, especially on the lower surface and have longer hairs on the margins near the base.

The tube is a shade of lilac to purple, the lower petal lobe is covered with short hairs and the inside of the tube has many spidery hairs. The 4 stamens do not extend beyond the petal tube.

Taxonomy and naming
In his description of a new species, Pholidia crassifolia (now Eremophila crassifolia) in 1853, Ferdinand von Mueller indirectly described Pholidia behriana. In 1859 he formally described Eremophila Behrii from a plant collected on the 1858-1859 expedition of Benjamin Babbage. The description was published in Report on the plants collected during Mr Babbage's expedition into the north- western interior of South Australia in 1858. From the description and locations of this specimen, it is clear that he was referring to the earlier description of Pholidia behriana, so the name Eremophila behriana is now used. The specific epithet (behriana) honours the German-born Hans Hermann Behr.

Distribution and habitat
This eremophila is widespread and common in the Eyre Peninsula, Northern Lofty, Murray, Yorke Peninsula, Southern Lofty and Kangaroo Island botanical regions of South Australia.

Conservation status
Eremophila behriana has been listed as "not at risk".

Use in horticulture
This eremophila is a hardy shrub, suitable as a filler between others. It can be propagated by cuttings or by grafting and the latter method would prevent the plant's suckering habit. It will grow in most soils, including heavy clay and is only temporarily damaged by frost.

References

Flora of South Australia
Flora of Victoria (Australia)
behriana
Plants described in 1859
Taxa named by Ferdinand von Mueller